The 2020–21 season is Vanoli Cremona's 22nd in existence and the club's 11th consecutive season in the top tier Italian basketball.

Overview 
The 2019-20 season ended with no winners due to the coronavirus pandemic and economical issues started to arise in the club. President Aldo Vanoli called the community for help and, at the end, he found new investors and managed to submit the subscription to the 2020–21 LBA season.

Meanwhile, in this first period of uncertainty, almost all players, except of Topias Palmi, were released. With the hiring of Paolo Galbiati as head coach, Cremona started building the team from the start.

With coach Galbiati the team had a decent performance such the he was renewed until 2023.

Kit 
Supplier: Errea / Sponsor: Vanoli

Players

Current roster

Depth chart

Squad changes

In

|}

Out

|}

Confirmed 

|}

Coach 
Coach Galbiati was extended at the end of January until 2023.

Competitions

Supercup

Serie A

See also 

 2020–21 LBA season
 2020 Italian Basketball Supercup

References 

2020–21 in Italian basketball by club